The Bus Preservation Society of Western Australia (BPSWA) is a bus preservation society in Western Australia. It operates a museum in Whiteman Park.

History
Following the closure of the Perth trolleybus system in August 1969, the Western Australian Transport Museum was formed. In 1981, the Western Australian Transport Museum divided into two societies, the Bus Museum of Western Australia (BMWA) and the Perth Electric Tramway Society. In 1982, the BPSWA found a permanent home in Whiteman Park.

The BPSWA operates a shuttle bus service from the Lord Street entrance to Whiteman Village in Whiteman Park during weekends.

Fleet
The BPSWA owns a fleet of 35 buses, mainly ex Transperth and Western Australian Government Railways.

Publication
The BPSWA publishes a quarterly periodical titled The Rattler.

References

External links

Buses of Australia
1981 establishments in Australia
Whiteman Park